This is a list of public art installations in Tampa, Florida, organized by neighborhoods in the city. These are works of public art accessible in an outdoor public space. Most of the works mentioned are sculptures. When this is not the case (i.e. sound installation, for example) it is stated next to the title.

Al López Park

Bayshore Beautiful

Bayshore Gardens

Bayside West

Beasley-Oak Park

Carver City-Lincoln Gardens

Channel District

Downtown

Forest Hills

Historic Hyde Park North

Jackson Heights

Lowry Park Central

Lowry Park North

Macfarlane Park

New Tampa

Northeast Macfarlane

Old Seminole Heights

Palm River-Clair Mel

Port Tampa

Sulphur Springs

Swann Estates

Temple Crest

University of South Florida

University Square

Uptown

Westshore

Woodland Terrace

Ybor City

References

Culture of Tampa, Florida
Tampa, Florida
Public art in Florida
Public art